The Wings (Korean: 날개) is a short novel written by the Korean author Yi Sang in 1936 and published in magazine Jo-Gwang (조광). It is one of the representative works in psychologism or intellectualism literature from the 1930s. It expresses anxiety, self-consciousness, depression and ego destruction.

Synopsis
It begins with a famous phrase “Have you ever seen a stuffed genius?(박제가 되어버린 천재’를 아시오?)". ‘I’ is not healthy, has intense self-consciousness and has no sense of reality. He was ‘Wife’s husband' and got his wife by trial and error.

After his wife goes out, he goes to her room to smell her cosmetics or burn her toilet paper with a magnifying glass to replace his desire for a wife. She feeds sleeping pills to him to prevent him from leaving the ‘Room without Sunlight’.

He goes up to the mountain to study his wife. ‘I’ ate six sleeping pills at once. ‘I’ wakes up after a night and day.

Sorry for suspecting his wife, ‘I’ returns home and accidentally sees what his wife is doing and runs away. ‘I’ finds himself on the roof of Mitsukoshi and recalls his past.

The siren of noon cries, and ‘I’ wanted to shout “Wings, spread out again! Fly. Fly. Fly. Let me fly once more. Let me fly just once more".

Publication
Yi Sang was diagnosed with tuberculosis in 1933. After his main works, including Crow’s eye view, he wrote The Wings, and traveled to Tokyo. He died in 1937.

This work was published in Jo-Gwang (조광) in September 1936. The English version of this work was published in 2001 by Ahn Jung-hyo and James B. Lee by Jimoondang Publishing Company.

Significance 
This work has historical significance in that it changed the literary technique of depicting self-consuming and self-disintegrating intellectuals of the colonial period and reflects the problem of social reality to consciousness.

In prior 1920s first-person point of view novels, the reports and confessions of witnesses and actual experiencers were not internalized by external expressions or planar constitutions. In this novel, these things were embodied through internalized experiments through the expression of psychology. It is considered a turning point of novel history.

The marriage relationship is a metaphor for the life in which the value of 'I' is neglected from daily life through the appearance of the husband being raised.

The paradoxical emergence of 'I' to overcome the obstacles of self-division  and to seek self-reliance was shaped by experimental literacy done by Yi Sang.

In particular, the internalization of consciousness and psychology has a new significance in the literature in the 1930s, in that it did not have to ignore social reality by replacing the pathology of colonial society with the contradictions and conflicts of individual life stories.

References

1936 novels